Raymond Julien Salles (18 July 1920 – 15 June 1996) was a French rower who competed in the 1952 Summer Olympics.

He was born in Paris.

In 1952 he was a crew member of the French boat which won the gold medal in the coxed pairs event.

External links
 profile

1920 births
1996 deaths
French male rowers
Olympic rowers of France
Rowers at the 1952 Summer Olympics
Olympic gold medalists for France
Olympic medalists in rowing
Medalists at the 1952 Summer Olympics
20th-century French people